The Iceland Sea is a small body of water delimited by the Jan Mayen fracture zone to the north, Greenland to the west, the Denmark Strait to the south, and the Jan Mayen Ridge to the east. Depths usually range from 500 to 2,000 meters but can be shallower on the Continental shelf of East Greenland. The Kolbeinsey Ridge crosses the Iceland Sea, dividing it into eastern and western parts.

According to the International Hydrographic Organization, in its 1953 edition of the Limits of Oceans and Seas standard, which as of 2021 is still in force, the Greenland Sea comprises the area of the Iceland Sea. The proposed 2002 edition defines the Iceland Sea as a zone of its own.

Marine life 
Many species of seals and whales reside in the frigid waters off Iceland's northern coast.

References 

Arctic Ocean
Seas of the Arctic Ocean
Geography of Iceland